Llangattock may refer to:

Places
Llangattock (sometimes historically Llangattock-juxta-Crickhowell), a village near Crickhowell in the Brecon Beacons National Park
Llangattock Lingoed, a village in northern Monmouthshire
Llangattock-Vibon-Avel, a parish in northeast Monmouthshire
Llangattock-juxta-Usk (or Llangattock nigh Usk), a parish south of Abergavenny
Llangattock-juxta-Caerleon, a parish containing the village of Caerleon

Landforms
Llangattock Mountain, a hill in the Brecon Beacons National Park

People
Baron Llangattock